Florin Costin Şoavă (born 24 July 1978) is a Romanian football coach and a former player who played as a defender.

Honours

Club
Rapid București 
 Romanian League Championship: 2002–03
 Cupa României: 2001–02
 Supercupa României: 2002, 2003

External links
 
 
 

1978 births
Living people
Romanian footballers
Romania international footballers
Romanian expatriate footballers
Expatriate footballers in Russia
Expatriate footballers in Ukraine
Russian Premier League players
FC U Craiova 1948 players
FC Rapid București players
FC Spartak Moscow players
PFC Krylia Sovetov Samara players
FC Khimki players
FC Arsenal Kyiv players
Association football defenders
Association football midfielders
Liga I players
Ukrainian Premier League players
Romanian expatriate sportspeople in Ukraine